U2 is a withdrawn EP by the experimental music and sound collage band Negativland, released in 1991. The EP and the band gained notoriety when lawyers representing Island Records, the record label of the band U2, sued over misleading artwork and the use of unauthorized sampling.

History

After Helter Stupid, Negativland's next project was the infamous U2 EP, which included outtakes from American Top 40 host Casey Kasem. In 1991, Negativland released this EP with the title "U2" displayed in very large type on the front of the packaging, and "Negativland" in a smaller typeface. An image of the Lockheed U-2 spy plane was also on the cover.

The songs within were parodies of the group U2's well-known 1987 song, "I Still Haven't Found What I'm Looking For", including kazoos and extensive sampling of the original song.  The song "I Still Haven't Found What I'm Looking For (Special Edit Radio Mix)" features a musical backing to an extended profane rant from disc jockey Casey Kasem, lapsing out of his more polished and professional tone during a frustrating taping, which was captured by several engineers, who had been passing it around for a number of years. One of Kasem's milder comments, after trying to deliver a run-down of U2's line-up, was "These guys are from England and who gives a shit?" All four members of U2 are actually from the Republic of Ireland, although Adam Clayton and The Edge were born in England. 

U2's label Island Records quickly sued Negativland, claiming that placing the word "U2" on the cover violated trademark law, as did the song itself. Island Records also claimed that the single was an attempt to deliberately confuse U2 fans, then awaiting the impending release of Achtung Baby.

After U2 was withdrawn and deleted it was replaced with another EP, Guns. The incident would be chronicled in the magazine/CD release The Letter U and the Numeral 2 (later re-released in expanded form as Fair Use: The Story of the Letter U and the Numeral 2), while the EP would be legally released a decade later with bonus material under the name of These Guys Are from England and Who Gives a Shit.

Track listing 
 "I Still Haven't Found What I'm Looking For" (1991 A Capella Mix) – 7:15
 "I Still Haven't Found What I'm Looking For" (Special Edit Radio Mix) – 5:46

Personnel
Mark Hosler - tapes, electronics, rhythms, Booper, clarinet, organ, viola, loops, guitar, etc.
Richard Lyons - tapes, electronics, rhythms, Booper, clarinet, organ, viola, loops, guitar, etc.
David Wills - synthesizer, voice, tape
Peter Dayton - guitars, viola
W. M. Kennedy - guitar
U2 - sound samples
Casey Kasem - sound samples

References 

1991 debut EPs
American Top 40
U2
Negativland EPs
Sampling controversies
SST Records EPs